Lepidochrysops skotios is a butterfly in the family Lycaenidae first described by Hamilton Herbert Druce in 1905. It is found in the Democratic Republic of the Congo (Katanga Province, Lualaba and possibly Kwango) and Zambia.

Adults have been recorded on wing in October and November.

References

Butterflies described in 1905
Lepidochrysops